The Finnish Athletics Championships is an annual track and field competition which serves as the national championship for Finland. It is organised by the Finnish Athletics Federation, Finland's national governing body for the sport of athletics. The winner of each event at the championships is declared the national champion for that year.

Men

100 metres
1960: Börje Strand
1961: Pentti Rekola
1962: Pauli Ny
1963: Pauli Ny
1964: Aarno Musku
1965: Aarno Musku
1966: Jorma Ehrström
1967: Erik Gustafsson
1968: Ossi Karttunen
1969: Ossi Karttunen
1970: Raimo Vilén
1971: Raimo Vilén
1972: Raimo Vilén
1973: Antti Rajamäki
1974: Antti Rajamäki
1975: Antti Rajamäki
1976: Raimo Räty
1977: Antti Rajamäki
1978: Antti Rajamäki
1979: Ossi Karttunen
1980: Esko Elsilä
1981: Tapani Turunen
1982: Jukka Sihvonen
1983: Kimmo Saaristo
1984: Kimmo Saaristo
1985: Kimmo Saaristo
1986: Kimmo Saaristo
1987: Ari Salonen
1988: Jarkko Toivonen
1989: Kari Niemi
1990: Turo Meriläinen
1991: Sami Länsivuori
1992: Sami Länsivuori
1993: Janne Haapasalo
1994: Ari Pakarinen
1995: Harri Kivelä
1996: Ari Pakarinen
1997: Harri Kivelä
1998: Janne Haapasalo
1999: Kim Lesch
2000: Tuomas Näsi
2001: Kari Louramo
2002: Markus Pöyhönen
2003: Markus Pöyhönen
2004: Stefan Koivikko
2005: Markus Pöyhönen
2006: Visa Hongisto

200 metres
1960: Börje Strand
1961: Börje Strand
1962: Börje Strand
1963: Pauli Ny
1964: Aarno Musku
1965: Aarno Musku
1966: Ossi Karttunen
1967: Ossi Karttunen
1968: Ossi Karttunen
1969: Ossi Karttunen
1970: Ossi Karttunen
1971: Markku Kukkoaho
1972: Antti Rajamäki
1973: Ossi Karttunen
1974: Ossi Karttunen
1975: Antti Rajamäki
1976: Markku Kukkoaho
1977: Ossi Karttunen
1978: Antti Rajamäki
1979: Jukka Sulalampi
1980: Hannu Mykrä
1981: Kimmo Saaristo
1982: Kimmo Saaristo
1983: Kimmo Saaristo
1984: Kimmo Saaristo
1985: Kimmo Saaristo
1986: Kimmo Saaristo
1987: Juha Pyy
1988: Sakari Syväoja
1989: Kai Kyllönen
1990: Matti Heusala
1991: Jouni Myllymäki
1992: Kari Niemi
1993: Ari Pakarinen
1994: Kai Kyllönen
1995: Ari Pakarinen
1996: Ari Pakarinen
1997: Janne Hautaniemi
1998: Harri Kivelä
1999: Aleksi Sillanpää
2000: Tommi Hartonen
2001: Tommi Hartonen
2002: Tommi Hartonen
2003: Samsa Tuikka
2004: Tommi Hartonen
2005: Visa Hongisto
2006: Nghi Tran

400 metres
1960: Jussi Rintamäki
1961: Jussi Rintamäki
1962: Jussi Rintamäki
1963: Matti Honkanen
1964: Erkki Kolkka
1965: Heikki Pippola
1966: Heikki Pippola
1967: Heikki Pippola
1968: Jaakko Tuominen
1969: Juhani Kotikoski
1970: Markku Kukkoaho
1971: Markku Kukkoaho
1972: Markku Kukkoaho
1973: Markku Taskinen
1974: Markku Kukkoaho
1975: Ossi Karttunen
1976: Ossi Karttunen
1977: Hannu Mäkelä
1978: Ossi Karttunen
1979: Heikki Hämäläinen
1980: Hannu Mykrä
1981: Hannu Mykrä
1982: Hannu Mykrä
1983: Matti Rusanen
1984: Hannu Mykrä
1985: Petri Hänninen
1986: Jari Niemelä
1987: Jari Niemelä
1988: Mika Hänninen
1989: Jari Niemelä
1990: Ari Pinomäki
1991: Ari Pinomäki
1992: Mikael Söderman
1993: Janne Pajunen
1994: Ari Pinomäki
1995: Kari Louramo
1996: Tommi Hartonen
1997: Petri Pohjonen
1998: Petri Pohjonen
1999: Petri Pohjonen
2000: Wilson Kirwa
2001: Mikko Karppi
2002: Wilson Kirwa
2003: Abdelghani Nouidra
2004: Antti Toivonen
2005: Ari Kauppinen
2006: Antti Toivonen

800 metres
1960: Olavi Salonen
1961: Olavi Salonen
1962: Olavi Salonen
1963: Olavi Salonen
1964: Pekka Juutilainen
1965: Juha Väätäinen
1966: Heikki Pippola
1967: Juha Väätäinen
1968: Olof Nyman
1969: Markku Aalto
1970: Pekka Vasala
1971: Pekka Vasala
1972: Pekka Vasala
1973: Markku Taskinen
1974: Markku Taskinen
1975: Markku Taskinen
1976: Markku Taskinen
1977: Ari Paunonen
1978: Markku Taskinen
1979: Antti Loikkanen
1980: Jorma Härkönen
1981: Jorma Härkönen
1982: Jorma Härkönen
1983: Jorma Härkönen
1984: Jorma Härkönen
1985: Ari Suhonen
1986: Ari Suhonen
1987: Ari Suhonen
1988: Ari Suhonen
1989: Ari Suhonen
1990: Ari Suhonen
1991: Ari Suhonen
1992: Ari Suhonen
1993: Ari Suhonen
1994: Mikael Söderman
1995: Mikael Söderman
1996: Esko Parpala
1997: Juha Kukkamo
1998: Wilson Kirwa
1999: Wilson Kirwa
2000: Wilson Kirwa
2001: Juha Kukkamo
2002: Wilson Kirwa
2003: Juha Kukkamo
2004: Wilson Kirwa
2005: Juha Kukkamo
2006: Mikko Lahtio

1500 metres
1960: Olavi Salonen
1961: Olavi Salonen
1962: Olavi Salonen
1963: Olavi Salonen
1964: Olavi Vuorisalo
1965: Olavi Salonen
1966: Jouko Uola
1967: Olof Nyman
1968: Matti Tuura
1969: Pekka Vasala
1970: Pekka Vasala
1971: Pekka Vasala
1972: Lasse Virén
1973: Jouko Niskanen
1974: Lasse Virén
1975: Pekka Päivärinta
1976: Markku Laine
1977: Ari Paunonen
1978: Juhani Sams
1979: Ari Paunonen
1980: Antti Loikkanen
1981: Markku Laine
1982: Ilkka Äyräväinen
1983: Timo Lehto
1984: Timo Lehto
1985: Eero Kytölä
1986: Ari Suhonen
1987: Ari Suhonen
1988: Ari Suhonen
1989: Ari Suhonen
1990: Jukka Savonheimo
1991: Jari Venäläinen
1992: Jukka Savonheimo
1993: Ari Suhonen
1994: Sami Alanen
1995: Jouni Varis
1996: Sami Ylihärsilä
1997: Sami Valtonen
1998: Samuli Vasala
1999: Anders Rockas
2000: Wilson Kirwa
2001: Juha Kukkamo
2002: Kim Bergdahl
2003: Jukka Keskisalo
2004: Jonas Hamm
2005: Jonas Hamm
2006: Jukka Keskisalo

5000 metres
1960: Reijo Höykinpuro
1961: Simo Saloranta
1962: Reijo Höykinpuro
1963: Simo Saloranta
1964: Simo Saloranta
1965: Pertti Sariomaa
1966: Mikko Ala-Leppilampi
1967: Jouko Kuha
1968: Seppo Matela
1969: Lasse Virén
1970: Mikko Ala-Leppilampi
1971: Rune Holmén
1972: Juha Väätäinen
1973: Risto Ala-Korpi
1974: Seppo Tuominen
1975: Pekka Päivärinta
1976: Lasse Virén
1977: Pekka Päivärinta
1978: Martti Vainio
1979: Hannu Okkola
1980: Martti Vainio
1981: Martti Vainio
1982: Martti Vainio
1983: Tommy Ekblom
1984: Hannu Okkola
1985: Jari Hemmilä
1986: Tommy Ekblom
1987: Martti Vainio
1988: Matti Valkonen
1989: Risto Ulmala
1990: Harri Hänninen
1991: Harri Hänninen
1992: Jukka Tammisuo
1993: Santtu Mäkinen
1994: Pasi Mattila
1995: Santtu Mäkinen
1996: Pasi Mattila
1997: Samuli Vasala
1998: Marko Kotila
1999: Samuli Vasala
2000: Marko Kotila
2001: Samuli Vasala
2002: Samuli Vasala
2003: Jari Matinlauri
2004: Jari Matinlauri
2005: Francis Kirwa
2006: Jussi Utriainen

10,000 metres
1960: Simo Saloranta
1961: Paavo Pystynen
1962: Reijo Höykinpuro
1963: Pentti Luoto
1964: Eino Oksanen
1965: Raimo Tikka
1966: Mikko Ala-Leppilampi
1967: Rauno Mattila
1968: Mikko Ala-Leppilampi
1969: Ossi Bäckmand
1970: Rauno Mattila
1971: Juha Väätäinen
1972: Seppo Matela
1973: Pekka Päivärinta
1974: Pekka Päivärinta
1975: Seppo Tuominen
1976: Pekka Päivärinta
1977: Martti Vainio
1978: Martti Vainio
1979: Kaarlo Maaninka
1980: Martti Vainio
1981: Martti Vainio
1982: Martti Vainio
1983: Martti Vainio
1984: Seppo Liuttu
1985: Ismo Toukonen
1986: Martti Vainio
1987: Martti Vainio
1988: Martti Vainio
1989: Risto Ulmala
1990: Matti Valkonen
1991: Risto Ulmala
1992: Harri Hänninen
1993: Santtu Mäkinen
1994: Pasi Mattila
1995: Santtu Mäkinen
1996: Pasi Mattila
1997: Santtu Mäkinen
1998: Harri Hänninen
1999: Janne Holmén
2000: Janne Holmén
2001: Janne Holmén
2002: Jari Matinlauri
2003: Janne Holmén
2004: Jari Matinlauri
2005: Tuomo Lehtinen
2006: Jussi Utriainen

20K run
1990: Ville Hautala
1991: Visa Orttenvuori
1992: Tuomo Keski-Ojala
1993: Tuomo Keski-Ojala
1994: Visa Orttenvuori
1995: Juuso Rainio

Half marathon
1996: Visa Orttenvuori
1997: Juuso Rainio
1998: Ville Hautala
1999: Ville Hautala
2000: Jussi Utriainen
2001: Pasi Mattila
2002: Yrjö Pesonen
2003: Francis Kirwa
2004: Jussi Utriainen
2005: Jussi Utriainen
2006: Jussi Utriainen

Marathon
1960: Eino Oksanen
1961: Paavo Kotila
1962: Tenho Salakka
1963: Paavo Pystynen
1964: Eino Valle
1965: Tenho Salakka
1966: Kalevi Ihaksi
1967: Kalevi Ihaksi
1968: Pentti Rummakko
1969: Pentti Rummakko
1970: Kalle Hakkarainen
1971: Pentti Rummakko
1972: Reino Paukkonen
1973: Reino Paukkonen
1974: Paavo Leiviskä
1975: Paavo Leiviskä
1976: Håkan Spik
1977: Håkan Spik
1978: Håkan Spik
1979: Jukka Toivola
1980: Esa Tikkanen
1981: Pertti Tiainen
1982: Niilo Kempe
1983: Håkan Spik
1984: Esa Liedes
1985: Vesa Kähköla
1986: Jouni Kortelainen
1987: Asko Uusimäki
1988: Vesa Kähköla
1989: Pekka Vähä-Vahe
1990: Ilkka Väänänen
1991: Pekka Vähä-Vahe
1992: Yrjö Pesonen
1993: Yrjö Pesonen
1994: Yrjö Pesonen
1995: Jussi Huttunen
1996: Jari Jaakkola
1997: Ville Hautala
1998: Lauri Friari
1999: Lauri Friari
2000: Yrjö Pesonen
2001: Jaakko Kero
2002: Yrjö Pesonen
2003: Yrjö Pesonen
2004: Petri Saavalainen
2005: Petri Saavalainen

3000 metres steeplechase
1960: Pentti Karvonen
1961: Esko Sirén
1962: Ilmari Kurkivuori
1963: Esko Sirén
1964: Jouko Kuha
1965: Esko Sirén
1966: Jouko Kuha
1967: Jouko Kuha
1968: Hannu Partanen
1969: Hannu Partanen
1970: Mikko Ala-Leppilampi
1971: Pekka Päivärinta
1972: Tapio Kantanen
1973: Tapio Kantanen
1974: Tapio Kantanen
1975: Tapio Kantanen
1976: Tapio Kantanen
1977: Tapio Kantanen
1978: Ismo Toukonen
1979: Tommy Ekblom
1980: Tapio Kantanen
1981: Tommy Ekblom
1982: Tommy Ekblom
1983: Ismo Toukonen
1984: Tommy Ekblom
1985: Lars Sörensen
1986: Tommy Ekblom
1987: Kari Hänninen
1988: Jörgen Salo
1989: Jörgen Salo
1990: Jörgen Salo
1991: Jörgen Salo
1992: Ville Hautala
1993: Ville Hautala
1994: Ville Hautala
1995: Ville Hautala
1996: Ville-Veikko Sainio
1997: Ville-Veikko Sainio
1998: Ville-Veikko Sainio
1999: Jan-Erik Salo
2000: Kim Bergdahl
2001: Kim Bergdahl
2002: Kim Bergdahl
2003: Jukka Keskisalo
2004: Kim Bergdahl
2005: Jukka Keskisalo
2006: Jukka Keskisalo

110 metres hurdles
1960: Raimo Koivu
1961: Raimo Koivu
1962: Aarre Asiala
1963: Juhani Vuori
1964: Matti Harri
1965: Antti Lanamäki
1966: Pekka Hyttinen
1967: Antti Lanamäki
1968: Ari Salin
1969: Ari Salin
1970: Esko Olkkonen
1971: Ari Salin
1972: Pauli Pursiainen
1973: Pauli Pursiainen
1974: Raimo Alanen
1975: Raimo Alanen
1976: Raimo Alanen
1977: Arto Bryggare
1978: Arto Bryggare
1979: Arto Bryggare
1980: Arto Bryggare
1981: Arto Bryggare
1982: Arto Bryggare
1983: Arto Bryggare
1984: Arto Bryggare
1985: Arto Bryggare
1986: Arto Bryggare
1987: Arto Bryggare
1988: Mikael Ylöstalo
1989: Mikael Ylöstalo
1990: Antti Haapakoski
1991: Kai Kyllönen
1992: Arto Bryggare
1993: Antti Haapakoski
1994: Antti Haapakoski
1995: Antti Haapakoski
1996: Antti Haapakoski
1997: Antti Haapakoski
1998: Eduard Hämäläinen
1999: Matti Niemi
2000: Jarno Jokihaara
2001: Jarno Jokihaara
2002: Marko Ritola
2003: Matti Niemi
2004: Marko Ritola
2005: Juha Sonck
2006: Marko Ritola

400 metres hurdles
1960: Jussi Rintamäki
1961: Jussi Rintamäki
1962: Jussi Rintamäki
1963: Jussi Rintamäki
1964: Jaakko Tuominen
1965: Pertti Pyrrö
1966: Jaakko Tuominen
1967: Pauli Haapasalo
1968: Jaakko Tuominen
1969: Jaakko Tuominen
1970: Ari Salin
1971: Ari Salin
1972: Ari Salin
1973: Reijo Koivu
1974: Ari Salin
1975: Raimo Alanen
1976: Raimo Alanen
1977: Raimo Alanen
1978: Raimo Alanen
1979: Raimo Alanen
1980: Raimo Alanen
1981: Peter Brandt
1982: Jarmo Seppä
1983: Ove Blomfelt
1984: Tapio Kallio
1985: Alberto von Hellens
1986: Jari Rautapalo
1987: Vesa-Pekka Pihlavisto
1988: Markku Karvonen
1989: Sören Kronqvist
1990: Vesa-Pekka Pihlavisto
1991: Vesa-Pekka Pihlavisto
1992: Ismo Hämeenniemi
1993: Vesa-Pekka Pihlavisto
1994: Vesa-Pekka Pihlavisto
1995: Petteri Pulkkinen
1996: Vesa-Pekka Pihlavisto
1997: Jaakko Aaltonen
1998: Petteri Pulkkinen
1999: Janne Mäkelä
2000: Janne Mäkelä
2001: Kimmo Haapasalo
2002: Janne Mäkelä
2003: Ari-Pekka Lattu
2004: Ari-Pekka Lattu
2005: Ari-Pekka Lattu
2006: Ari-Pekka Lattu

High jump
1960: Eero Salminen
1961: Henrik Hellén
1962: Henrik Hellén
1963: Henrik Hellén
1964: Henrik Hellén
1965: Pertti Lantti
1966: Reijo Vähälä
1967: Antero Tapola
1968: Antero Tapola
1969: Antero Tapola
1970: Reijo Vähälä
1971: Asko Pesonen
1972: Lasse Viskari
1973: Asko Pesonen
1974: Asko Pesonen
1975: Harri Sundell
1976: Asko Pesonen
1977: Asko Pesonen
1978: Juha Porkka
1979: Matti Nieminen
1980: Ossi Aura
1981: Juha Porkka
1982: Mikko Levola
1983: Jouko Kilpi
1984: Erkki Niemi
1985: Mikko Levola
1986: Timo Ruuskanen
1987: Mikko Levola
1988: Veli-Pekka Kokkonen
1989: Mikko Levola
1990: Matti Viitala
1991: Juha Isolehto
1992: Juha Isolehto
1993: Juha Isolehto
1994: Juha Isolehto
1995: Juha Isolehto
1996: Oskari Frösén
1997: Juha Isolehto
1998: Mika Polku
1999: Oskari Frösén
2000: Mika Polku
2001: Mika Polku
2002: Oskari Frösén
2003: Mika Polku
2004: Oskari Frösén
2005: Oskari Frösén
2006: Heikki Taneli

Pole vault
1960: Eeles Landström
1961: Risto Ankio
1962: Pentti Nikula
1963: Kauko Nyström
1964: Pentti Nikula
1965: Aulis Kairento
1966: Risto Ivanoff
1967: Risto Ivanoff
1968: Erkki Mustakari
1969: Erkki Mustakari
1970: Auvo Pehkoranta
1971: Antti Kalliomäki
1972: Antti Kalliomäki
1973: Antti Kalliomäki
1974: Antti Kalliomäki
1975: Antti Kalliomäki
1976: Tapani Haapakoski
1977: Antti Kalliomäki
1978: Antti Kalliomäki
1979: Kimmo Pallonen
1980: Rauli Pudas
1981: Kimmo Pallonen
1982: Antti Kalliomäki
1983: Veijo Vannesluoma
1984: Kimmo Pallonen
1985: Kimmo Pallonen
1986: Kimmo Kuusela
1987: Kimmo Kuusela
1988: Asko Peltoniemi
1989: Jani Lehtonen
1990: Petri Peltoniemi
1991: Petri Peltoniemi
1992: Asko Peltoniemi
1993: Jani Lehtonen
1994: Jani Lehtonen
1995: Heikki Vääräniemi
1996: Heikki Vääräniemi
1997: Vesa Rantanen
1998: Heikki Vääräniemi
1999: Jussi Autio
2000: Vesa Rantanen
2001: Vesa Rantanen
2002: Mikko Latvala
2003: Matti Mononen
2004: Vesa Rantanen
2005: Mikko Latvala
2006: Matti Mononen

Long jump
1960: Juhani Manninen
1961: Jorma Valkama
1962: Rainer Stenius
1963: Pentti Eskola
1964: Aarre Asiala
1965: Rainer Stenius
1966: Rainer Stenius
1967: Pertti Pousi
1968: Pertti Pousi
1969: Pertti Pousi
1970: Kari Palmén
1971: Mauri Myllymäki
1972: Ari Väänänen
1973: Ari Väänänen
1974: Pekka Suvitie
1975: Ari Väänänen
1976: Esko Elsilä
1977: Erkki Päivärinta
1978: Esko Elsilä
1979: Pekka Suvitie
1980: Olli Pousi
1981: Hannu Puhakka
1982: Jarmo Kärnä
1983: Jarmo Kärnä
1984: Jarmo Kärnä
1985: Jarmo Kärnä
1986: Petri Keskitalo
1987: Jarmo Kärnä
1988: Jarmo Kärnä
1989: Juha Kivi
1990: Jarmo Kärnä
1991: Jarmo Kärnä
1992: Mika Kahma
1993: Juha Kivi
1994: Otto Kärki
1995: Jami Hirvonen
1996: Kenneth Kastrén
1997: Otto Kärki
1998: Niklas Rorarius
1999: Kenneth Kastrén
2000: Kenneth Kastrén
2001: Tommi Evilä
2002: Niklas Rorarius
2003: Tommi Evilä
2004: Tommi Evilä
2005: Tommi Evilä
2006: Tommi Evilä

Triple jump
1960: Kari Rahkamo
1961: Yrjö Tamminen
1962: Yrjö Tamminen
1963: Yrjö Tamminen
1964: Yrjö Tamminen
1965: Kaj Helminen
1966: Pertti Pousi
1967: Pertti Pousi
1968: Pertti Pousi
1969: Pertti Pousi
1970: Ismo Salmi
1971: Pentti Kuukasjärvi
1972: Pentti Kuukasjärvi
1973: Juhani Mäki-Maunas
1974: Pentti Kuukasjärvi
1975: Pentti Kuukasjärvi
1976: Pentti Kuukasjärvi
1977: Pentti Kuukasjärvi
1978: Pentti Kuukasjärvi
1979: Olli Pousi
1980: Olli Pousi
1981: Olli Pousi
1982: Markku Rokala
1983: Esa Viitasalo
1984: Esa Viitasalo
1985: Esa Viitasalo
1986: Harri Pesonen
1987: Heikki Herva
1988: Esa Viitasalo
1989: Tuomas Sallinen
1990: Heikki Herva
1991: Markku Rokala
1992: Markku Rokala
1993: Heikki Herva
1994: Heikki Herva
1995: Jari Lämsä
1996: Marko Leino
1997: Johan Meriluoto
1998: Johan Meriluoto
1999: Johan Meriluoto
2000: Johan Meriluoto
2001: Johan Meriluoto
2002: Johan Meriluoto
2003: Johan Meriluoto
2004: Janne Harju
2005: Johan Meriluoto
2006: Johan Meriluoto

Shot put
1960: Jarmo Kunnas
1961: Alpo Nisula
1962: Jarmo Kunnas
1963: Seppo Simola
1964: Seppo Simola
1965: Matti Yrjölä
1966: Matti Yrjölä
1967: Matti Yrjölä
1968: Matti Yrjölä
1969: Matti Yrjölä
1970: Seppo Simola
1971: Seppo Simola
1972: Seppo Simola
1973: Reijo Ståhlberg
1974: Reijo Ståhlberg
1975: Matti Yrjölä
1976: Reijo Ståhlberg
1977: Reijo Ståhlberg
1978: Reijo Ståhlberg
1979: Reijo Ståhlberg
1980: Reijo Ståhlberg
1981: Reijo Ståhlberg
1982: Reijo Ståhlberg
1983: Aulis Akonniemi
1984: Aulis Akonniemi
1985: Aulis Toivonen
1986: Jari Kuoppa
1987: Janne Ronkainen
1988: Jari Kuoppa
1989: Janne Ronkainen
1990: Janne Ronkainen
1991: Petri Torniainen
1992: Antero Paljakka
1993: Markus Koistinen
1994: Mika Halvari
1995: Mika Halvari
1996: Arsi Harju
1997: Mika Halvari
1998: Arsi Harju
1999: Ville Tiisanoja
2000: Arsi Harju
2001: Conny Karlsson
2002: Conny Karlsson
2003: Tepa Reinikainen
2004: Tepa Reinikainen
2005: Ville Tiisanoja
2006: Ville Tiisanoja

Discus throw
1960: Pentti Repo
1961: Carol Lindroos
1962: Pentti Repo
1963: Pentti Repo
1964: Pentti Repo
1965: Pentti Repo
1966: Pentti Repo
1967: Niilo Hangasvaara
1968: Niilo Hangasvaara
1969: Jouko Montonen
1970: Pentti Kahma
1971: Pentti Kahma
1972: Jorma Rinne
1973: Pentti Kahma
1974: Pentti Kahma
1975: Pentti Kahma
1976: Pentti Kahma
1977: Markku Tuokko
1978: Pentti Kahma
1979: Markku Tuokko
1980: Markku Tuokko
1981: Markku Tuokko
1982: Markku Tuokko
1983: Ari Huumonen
1984: Juhani Tuomola
1985: Ari Huumonen
1986: Raimo Vento
1987: Ari Huumonen
1988: Mika Muukka
1989: Raimo Vento
1990: Mika Muukka
1991: Heikki Hollmén
1992: Heikki Hollmén
1993: Martti Halmesmäki
1994: Harri Uurainen
1995: Harri Uurainen
1996: Timo Sinervo
1997: Harri Uurainen
1998: Timo Tompuri
1999: Pertti Hynni
2000: Timo Tompuri
2001: Timo Tompuri
2002: Mika Loikkanen
2003: Timo Tompuri
2004: Pertti Hynni
2005: Timo Tompuri
2006: Mikko Kyyrö

Hammer throw
1960: Kalevi Horppu
1961: Kalevi Horppu
1962: Kalevi Horppu
1963: Kalevi Horppu
1964: Reino Sauripää
1965: Kauko Harlos
1966: Kauko Harlos
1967: Kauko Harlos
1968: Kauko Harlos
1969: Kauko Harlos
1970: Risto Miettinen
1971: Risto Miettinen
1972: Raimo Savinainen
1973: Heikki Kangas
1974: Matti Järvensivu
1975: Harri Huhtala
1976: Harri Huhtala
1977: Juha Tiainen
1978: Hannu Polvi
1979: Juha Tiainen
1980: Harri Huhtala
1981: Juha Tiainen
1982: Harri Huhtala
1983: Harri Huhtala
1984: Juha Tiainen
1985: Harri Huhtala
1986: Harri Huhtala
1987: Juha Tiainen
1988: Harri Huhtala
1989: Harri Huhtala
1990: Juha Tiainen
1991: Lasse Akselin
1992: Lasse Akselin
1993: Marko Wahlman
1994: Mika Laaksonen
1995: Marko Wahlman
1996: Marko Wahlman
1997: Marko Wahlman
1998: Olli-Pekka Karjalainen
1999: Olli-Pekka Karjalainen
2000: Olli-Pekka Karjalainen
2001: Olli-Pekka Karjalainen
2002: Olli-Pekka Karjalainen
2003: Olli-Pekka Karjalainen
2004: Olli-Pekka Karjalainen
2005: Olli-Pekka Karjalainen
2006: Olli-Pekka Karjalainen

Javelin throw
1960: Väinö Kuisma
1961: Pauli Nevala
1962: Pauli Nevala
1963: Pauli Nevala
1964: Jorma Kinnunen
1965: Jorma Kinnunen
1966: Jorma Kinnunen
1967: Pauli Nevala
1968: Jorma Kinnunen
1969: Jorma Kinnunen
1970: Hannu Siitonen
1971: Hannu Siitonen
1972: Hannu Siitonen
1973: Hannu Siitonen
1974: Hannu Siitonen
1975: Aimo Aho
1976: Seppo Hovinen
1977: Seppo Hovinen
1978: Antero Puranen
1979: Esa Utriainen
1980: Pentti Sinersaari
1981: Antero Toivonen
1982: Arto Härkönen
1983: Pentti Sinersaari
1984: Tero Saviniemi
1985: Seppo Räty
1986: Seppo Räty
1987: Tapio Korjus
1988: Tapio Korjus
1989: Seppo Räty
1990: Seppo Räty
1991: Seppo Räty
1992: Juha Laukkanen
1993: Seppo Räty
1994: Juha Laukkanen
1995: Seppo Räty
1996: Seppo Räty
1997: Sami Saksio
1998: Aki Parviainen
1999: Aki Parviainen
2000: Aki Parviainen
2001: Aki Parviainen
2002: Aki Parviainen
2003: Aki Parviainen
2004: Tero Pitkämäki
2005: Tero Pitkämäki
2006: Tero Pitkämäki

Decathlon
1960: Markus Kahma
1961: Ossi Ojala
1962: Stig Nymander
1963: Stig Nymander
1964: Markus Kahma
1965: Stig Nymander
1966: Stig Nymander
1967: Timo Tuominen
1968: Timo Tuominen
1969: Hannu Kyösola
1970: Jorma Vesala
1971: Markku Juhola
1972: Pekka Suvitie
1973: Heikki Kyösola
1974: Heikki Kyösola
1975: Pekka Suvitie
1976: Heikki Leppänen
1977: Johannes Lahti
1978: Johannes Lahti
1979: Jan-Erik Romar
1980: Johannes Lahti
1981: Kari-Pekka Lax
1982: Johannes Lahti
1983: Jarmo Mäkelä
1984: Harri Sundell
1985: Henrik Broman
1986: Henrik Broman
1987: Petri Keskitalo
1988: Kaj Ekman
1989: Mikko Valle
1990: Kaj Ekman
1991: Jari Näkki
1992: Mikko Valle
1993: Mikko Valle
1994: Jarkko Finni
1995: Mikko Valle
1996: Mikko Valle
1997: Mikko Valle
1998: Mikko Valle
1999: Glenn Lindqvist
2000: Eduard Hämäläinen
2001: Jukka Väkeväinen
2002: Jukka Väkeväinen
2003: Henri Kokkonen
2004: Jaakko Ojaniemi
2005: Aki Heikkinen
2006: Lassi Raunio

10 kilometres walk
1971: Pauli Hokkanen

20 kilometres walk
The 1985 and 2001 championships were held on a track.
1960: Pentti Kallionpää
1961: Pentti Kallionpää
1962: Pekka Viljanen
1963: Pentti Kallionpää
1964: Martti Hokkanen
1965: Martti Hokkanen
1966: Martti Hokkanen
1967: Martti Hokkanen
1968: Paavo Pohjolainen
1969: Paavo Pohjolainen
1970: Paavo Pohjolainen
1971: Seppo Immonen
1972: Paavo Pohjolainen
1973: Reima Salonen
1974: Reima Salonen
1975: Reima Salonen
1976: Reima Salonen
1977: Reima Salonen
1978: Reima Salonen
1979: Reima Salonen
1980: Reima Salonen
1981: Reima Salonen
1982: Reima Salonen
1983: Reima Salonen
1984: Matti Katila
1985: Reima Salonen
1986: Reima Salonen
1987: Reima Salonen
1988: Reima Salonen
1989: Kari Ahonen
1990: Kari Ahonen
1991: Valentin Kononen
1992: Valentin Kononen
1993: Kari Ahonen
1994: Valentin Kononen
1995: Valentin Kononen
1996: Risto Nurmi
1997: Valentin Kononen
1998: Antero Lindman
1999: Valentin Kononen
2000: Valentin Kononen
2001: Jani Lehtinen
2002: Jani Lehtinen
2003: Jani Lehtinen
2004: Jani Lehtinen
2005: Antti Kempas
2006: Antti Kempas

30 kilometres walk
1965: Martti Hokkanen
1966: Martti Hokkanen
1967: Martti Hokkanen
1968: Daniel Björkgren

50 kilometres walk
1960: Paavo Saira
1961: Mikko Saira
1962: Paavo Saira
1963: Paavo Saira
1964: Paavo Saira
1965: Not held
1966: Not held
1967: Not held
1968: Not held
1969: Paavo Saira
1970: Paavo Pohjolainen
1971: Paavo Saira
1972: Paavo Pohjolainen
1973: Stig Fröberg
1974: Reima Salonen
1975: Reima Salonen
1976: Seppo Immonen
1977: Reima Salonen
1978: Reima Salonen
1979: Reima Salonen
1980: Matti Katila
1981: Reima Salonen
1982: Reima Salonen
1983: Matti Katila
1984: Reima Salonen
1985: Reima Salonen
1986: Reima Salonen
1987: Reima Salonen
1988: Veijo Savikko
1989: Kari Ahonen
1990: Kari Ahonen
1991: Antero Lindman
1992: Antero Lindman
1993: Antero Lindman
1994: Valentin Kononen
1995: Antero Lindman
1996: Antero Lindman
1997: Jani Lehtinen
1998: Heikki Kinnunen
1999: Antero Lindman
2000: Asko Turkki
2001: Seppo-Juhani Savolainen
2002: Seppo-Juhani Savolainen
2003: Antti Kempas
2004: Antti Kempas
2005: Timo Viljanen
2006: Timo Viljanen

Cross country (long course)
1960: Paavo Pystynen
1961: Paavo Pystynen
1962: Sakari Peltoniemi
1963: Jorma Virtanen
1964: Taisto Teräväinen
1965: Jouko Kuha
1966: Mikko Ala-Leppilampi
1967: Erkki Koskinen
1968: Jouko Kuha
1969: Seppo Tuominen
1970: Seppo Tuominen
1971: Seppo Tuominen
1972: Tapio Kantanen
1973: Pekka Päivärinta
1974: Pekka Päivärinta
1975: Pekka Päivärinta
1976: Pekka Päivärinta
1977: Pekka Päivärinta
1978: Kaarlo Maaninka
1979: Kaarlo Maaninka
1980: Kaarlo Maaninka
1981: Martti Vainio
1982: Jouni Kortelainen
1983: Martti Vainio
1984: Henrik Sandström
1985: Jari Hemmilä
1986: Martti Vainio
1987: Martti Vainio
1988: Matti Valkonen
1989: Risto Ulmala
1990: Risto Ulmala
1991: Risto Ulmala
1992: Harri Hänninen
1993: Harri Hänninen
1994: Risto Ulmala
1995: Veli-Matti Ranta
1996: Visa Orttenvuori
1997: Harri Hänninen
1998: Ville Hautala
1999: Pasi Mattila
2000: Jussi Utriainen
2001: Jussi Utriainen
2002: Jari Matinlauri
2003: Jussi Utriainen
2004: Jussi Utriainen
2005: Tuomo Lehtinen
2006: Jussi Utriainen

Cross country (short course)
1960: Olavi Salonen
1961: Olavi Salonen
1962: Olavi Salonen
1963: Esko Sirén
1964: Pentti Rissanen
1965: Pentti Rissanen
1966: Pentti Rissanen
1967: Esko Sirén
1968: Olavi Suomalainen
1969: Reino Ahvenainen
1970: Mikko Ala-Leppilampi
1971: Mikko Ala-Leppilampi
1972: Mikko Ala-Leppilampi
1973: Tapio Kantanen
1974: Risto Ala-Korpi
1975: Tapio Kantanen
1976: Lasse Virén
1977: Ari Paunonen
1978: Lasse Virén
1979: Ari Paunonen
1980: Ari Paunonen
1981: Tommy Ekblom
1982: Tommy Ekblom
1983: Tommy Ekblom
1984: Tommy Ekblom
1985: Tommy Ekblom
1986: Matti Valkonen
1987: Harri Hänninen
1988: Risto Ulmala
1989: Harri Hänninen
1990: Harri Hänninen
1991: Jörgen Salo
1992: Jari Venäläinen
1993: Jari Venäläinen
1994: Sami Alanen
1995: Mika Maaskola
1996: Samuli Vasala
1997: Samuli Vasala
1998: Marko Kotila
1999: Marko Kotila
2000: Marko Kotila
2001: Samuli Vasala
2002: Samuli Vasala
2003: Jari Matinlauri
2004: Jussi Utriainen
2005: Simo Wannas
2006: Jukka Keskisalo

Women

100 metres
1960: Brita Johansson
1961: Brita Johansson
1962: Brita Johansson
1963: Maija Koivusaari
1964: Maija Koivusaari
1965: Maija Koivusaari
1966: Sirkka Norrlund
1967: Mona-Lisa Pursiainen
1968: Mona-Lisa Pursiainen
1969: Mona-Lisa Pursiainen
1970: Mona-Lisa Pursiainen
1971: Tuula Rautanen
1972: Tuula Rautanen
1973: Mona-Lisa Pursiainen
1974: Mona-Lisa Pursiainen
1975: Mona-Lisa Pursiainen
1976: Mona-Lisa Pursiainen
1977: Mona-Lisa Pursiainen
1978: Helinä Marjamaa
1979: Helinä Marjamaa
1980: Riitta Vesanen
1981: Helinä Marjamaa
1982: Helinä Marjamaa
1983: Helinä Marjamaa
1984: Helinä Marjamaa
1985: Sisko Hanhijoki
1986: Sisko Hanhijoki
1987: Auli Marttinen
1988: Sisko Hanhijoki
1989: Sisko Hanhijoki
1990: Sisko Hanhijoki
1991: Sisko Hanhijoki
1992: Sisko Hanhijoki
1993: Sanna Kyllönen
1994: Sanna Kyllönen
1995: Sanna Kyllönen
1996: Sanna Kyllönen
1997: Sanna Kyllönen
1998: Sanna Kyllönen
1999: Sanna Kyllönen
2000: Heidi Hannula
2001: Johanna Manninen
2002: Johanna Manninen
2003: Johanna Manninen
2004: Johanna Manninen
2005: Heidi Hannula
2006: Heidi Hannula

200 metres
1960: Aulikki Jaakkola
1961: Sirkka Norrlund
1962: Hilkka Kivistö
1963: Hilkka Kivistö
1964: Sirkka Norrlund
1965: Eeva Haimi
1966: Sirkka Norrlund
1967: Mona-Lisa Pursiainen
1968: Mona-Lisa Pursiainen
1969: Mona-Lisa Pursiainen
1970: Mona-Lisa Pursiainen
1971: Marika Lindholm
1972: Pirjo Häggman
1973: Tuula Rautanen
1974: Riitta Salin
1975: Riitta Salin
1976: Pirjo Häggman
1977: Pirjo Häggman
1978: Pirjo Häggman
1979: Helinä Marjamaa
1980: Pirjo Häggman
1981: Helinä Marjamaa
1982: Margareetta Honkaharju
1983: Helinä Marjamaa
1984: Helinä Marjamaa
1985: Sisko Hanhijoki
1986: Sisko Hanhijoki
1987: Auli Marttinen
1988: Sisko Hanhijoki
1989: Sisko Hanhijoki
1990: Sisko Hanhijoki
1991: Sisko Hanhijoki
1992: Sisko Hanhijoki
1993: Sanna Kyllönen
1994: Sanna Kyllönen
1995: Sanna Kyllönen
1996: Sanna Kyllönen
1997: Sanna Kyllönen
1998: Sanna Kyllönen
1999: Sanna Kyllönen
2000: Johanna Manninen
2001: Johanna Manninen
2002: Johanna Manninen
2003: Johanna Manninen
2004: Kirsi Mykkänen
2005: Kirsi Mykkänen
2006: Sari Keskitalo

400 metres
1960: Aulikki Jaakkola
1961: Aulikki Jaakkola
1962: Eeva Haimi
1963: Eeva Haimi
1964: Eeva Haimi
1965: Eeva Haimi
1966: Eeva Haimi
1967: Eeva Haimi
1968: Eeva Haimi
1969: Eeva Haimi
1970: Mona-Lisa Pursiainen
1971: Marika Lindholm
1972: Pirjo Häggman
1973: Pirjo Häggman
1974: Riitta Salin
1975: Riitta Salin
1976: Riitta Salin
1977: Barbro Lindström
1978: Pirjo Häggman
1979: Pirjo Häggman
1980: Pirjo Häggman
1981: Terhi Tarkiainen
1982: Terhi Tarkiainen
1983: Terhi Tarkiainen
1984: Riitta Vesanen
1985: Tuija Helander
1986: Sonja Finell
1987: Tuija Helander-Kuusisto
1988: Sonja Finell
1989: Sonja Finell
1990: Sonja Finell
1991: Sonja Finell
1992: Sonja Finell
1993: Satu Jääskeläinen
1994: Heidi Suomi
1995: Heidi Suomi
1996: Riikka Niemelä
1997: Petra Söderström
1998: Petra Söderström
1999: Petra Söderström
2000: Petra Söderström
2001: Suvi Myllymäki
2002: Suvi Myllymäki
2003: Kirsi Mykkänen
2004: Kirsi Mykkänen
2005: Kirsi Mykkänen
2006: Kirsi Mykkänen

800 metres
1960: Eila Mikola
1961: Saara Vilén
1962: Anita Aittala
1963: Eeva-Liisa Kalliolahti
1964: Eila Pellinen
1965: Eila Mikola
1966: Eeva-Liisa Kalliolahti
1967: Eeva-Liisa Kalliolahti
1968: Eeva Haimi
1969: Eeva Haimi
1970: Aila Virkberg
1971: Sinikka Tyynelä
1972: Sinikka Tyynelä
1973: Sinikka Tyynelä
1974: Aila Virkberg
1975: Nina Holmén
1976: Nina Holmén
1977: Sinikka Tyynelä
1978: Sinikka Tyynelä
1979: Yvonne Hannus
1980: Yvonne Hannus
1981: Yvonne Hannus
1982: Yvonne Hannus
1983: Irene Lusikka
1984: Kaisa Ylimäki
1985: Kaisa Ylimäki
1986: Kaisa Ylimäki
1987: Tiina Pakkala
1988: Tiina Pakkala
1989: Hanna Vuorimaa
1990: Tuuli Merikoski
1991: Tuuli Merikoski
1992: Marjo Piipponen
1993: Marjo Piipponen
1994: Satu Jääskeläinen
1995: Tytti Reho
1996: Monika Rönnholm
1997: Monika Kinnunen
1998: Marjo Venäläinen
1999: Tytti Reho
2000: Tytti Reho
2001: Suvi Myllymäki
2002: Suvi Myllymäki
2003: Minna Järvenpää
2004: Mari Järvenpää
2005: Suvi Myllymäki
2006: Mari Järvenpää

1500 metres
1968: Pirjo Vihonen
1969: Pirjo Vihonen
1970: Pirjo Vihonen
1971: Sinikka Tyynelä
1972: Sinikka Tyynelä
1973: Sinikka Tyynelä
1974: Nina Holmén
1975: Nina Holmén
1976: Nina Holmén
1977: Sinikka Tyynelä
1978: Sinikka Tyynelä
1979: Aila Virkberg
1980: Aila Virkberg
1981: Marjo-Riitta Lakka
1982: Marjo-Riitta Lakka
1983: Marjo-Riitta Lakka
1984: Irene Marttila
1985: Marjo-Riitta Lakka
1986: Marjo-Riitta Lakka
1987: Päivi Tikkanen
1988: Kaisa Siitonen
1989: Kaisa Siitonen
1990: Päivi Tikkanen
1991: Kaisa Siitonen
1992: Monika Rönnholm
1993: Monika Rönnholm
1994: Marjo Piipponen
1995: Marjo Venäläinen
1996: Monika Rönnholm
1997: Monika Kinnunen
1998: Marjo Venäläinen
1999: Marjo Venäläinen
2000: Tytti Reho
2001: Minna Nummela
2002: Johanna Lehtinen
2003: Johanna Lehtinen
2004: Johanna Lehtinen
2005: Johanna Lehtinen
2006: Johanna Lehtinen

3000 metres
1972: Nina Holmén
1973: Pirjo Vihonen
1974: Sinikka Tyynelä
1975: Helena Pietilä
1976: Irja Paukkonen
1977: Sinikka Tyynelä
1978: Sinikka Tyynelä
1979: Aila Virkberg
1980: Tuija Toivonen
1981: Marjo-Riitta Lakka
1982: Helena Heikkinen
1983: Helena Heikkinen
1984: Tuija Toivonen
1985: Päivi Tikkanen
1986: Päivi Tikkanen
1987: Päivi Tikkanen
1988: Päivi Tikkanen
1989: Päivi Tikkanen
1990: Päivi Tikkanen
1991: Päivi Tikkanen
1992: Päivi Tikkanen
1993: Päivi Tikkanen
1994: Päivi Tikkanen

5000 metres
1995: Annemari Sandell-Hyvärinen
1996: Päivi Tikkanen
1997: Tuula Laitinen
1998: Päivi Tikkanen
1999: Annemari Sandell-Hyvärinen
2000: Annemari Sandell-Hyvärinen
2001: Elina Lindgren
2002: Ulla Tuimala
2003: Kirsi Valasti
2004: Kirsi Valasti
2005: Annemari Sandell-Hyvärinen
2006: Ulla Tuimala

10,000 metres
1983: Kristina Iisakkila
1984: Tuija Toivonen
1985: Tuija Toivonen
1986: Sinikka Keskitalo
1987: Tuija Jousimaa
1988: Tuija Jousimaa
1989: Päivi Tikkanen
1990: Päivi Tikkanen
1991: Päivi Tikkanen
1992: Päivi Tikkanen
1993: Ritva Lemettinen
1994: Annemari Sandell-Hyvärinen
1995: Päivi Tikkanen
1996: Päivi Tikkanen
1997: Päivi Tikkanen
1998: Päivi Tikkanen
1999: Kirsi Rauta
2000: Maria Söderström
2001: Kirsi Valasti
2002: Maria Söderström
2003: Kirsi Valasti
2004: Maija Kukkohovi
2005: Annemari Sandell-Hyvärinen
2006: Maija Oravamäki

15K run
1990: Kirsi Rauta
1991: Kirsi Rauta
1992: Ritva Lemettinen
1993: Carita Sunell
1994: Ritva Lemettinen
1995: Erja Ervonen

Half marathon
1996: Kirsi Rauta
1997: Marjaana Lahti-Koski
1998: Päivi Tikkanen
1999: Päivi Kauppinen
2000: Maria Söderström
2001: Maria Söderström
2002: Mari Niskanen
2003: Minna Myllykoski
2004: Elina Lindgren
2005: Maija Oravamäki
2006: Johanna Lehtinen

Marathon
1980: Tuija Toivonen
1981: Elli Hallikainen
1982: Tuija Toivonen
1983: Sinikka Keskitalo
1984: Sinikka Keskitalo
1985: Sinikka Keskitalo
1986: Sirkku Kumpulainen
1987: Sirpa Kytölä
1988: Sirpa Kytölä
1989: Marita Ylillkka
1990: Sinikka Keskitalo
1991: Sinikka Keskitalo
1992: Sari Juhola
1993: Anne Jääskeläinen
1994: Anne Jääskeläinen
1995: Anne Jääskeläinen
1996: Erja Ervonen
1997: Marjaana Lahti-Koski
1998: Sari Juntunen
1999: Marjaana Lahti-Koski
2000: Erja Nurkkala
2001: Maija Kukkohovi
2002: Kaisa Lettojärvi
2003: Pauliina Rasmus
2004: Marjaana Lahti-Koski
2005: Mira Tuominen

3000 metres steeplechase
2001: Johanna Lehtinen
2002: Ulla Tuimala
2003: Maria Söderström
2004: Heidi Strandvall
2005: Anni Tuimala
2006: Mira Tuominen

80 metres hurdles
1960: Tellervo Toppila
1961: Sirkka Norrlund
1962: Sirkka Norrlund
1963: Sirkka Norrlund
1964: Sirkka Norrlund
1965: Sirkka Norrlund
1966: Sirkka Norrlund
1967: Sirkka Norrlund
1968: Sirkka Norrlund

100 metres hurdles
1969: Sirkka Norrlund
1970: Sirkka Norrlund
1971: Sirkka Norrlund
1972: Sirkka Norrlund
1973: Ulla Lempiänen
1974: Ulla Lempiänen
1975: Ulla Lempiänen
1976: Ulla Lempiänen
1977: Ulla Lempiänen
1978: Lena Spoof
1979: Lena Spoof
1980: Lena Spoof
1981: Tiina Lindgren
1982: Lena Spoof
1983: Saila Purho
1984: Ritva Valkeinen
1985: Tiina Lindgren
1986: Saila Purho
1987: Tiina Lindgren
1988: Satu Pauri
1989: Satu Pauri
1990: Satu Pauri
1991: Satu Pauri
1992: Paula Välimaa
1993: Jutta Kemilä
1994: Jutta Kemilä
1995: Jutta Kemilä
1996: Heini Sistonen
1997: Johanna Halkoaho
1998: Johanna Halkoaho
1999: Tiia Hautala
2000: Manuela Bosco
2001: Susanna Rajamäki
2002: Johanna Halkoaho
2003: Johanna Halkoaho
2004: Johanna Halkoaho
2005: Hanna Korell
2006: Johanna Halkoaho

200 metres hurdles
1968: Sirkka Norrlund
1969: Sirkka Norrlund
1970: Sirkka Norrlund
1971: Sirkka Norrlund
1972: Pirja Hakala
1973: Pirja Hakala
1974: Pirja Hakala

400 metres hurdles
1975: Hannele Parkkonen
1976: Hannele Parkkonen
1977: Tuija Helander
1978: Tuuli Heinonen
1979: Hannele Parkkonen
1980: Tuija Helander
1981: Tuuli Heinonen
1982: Tuija Helander
1983: Tuija Helander
1984: Tuija Helander
1985: Tuija Helander
1986: Tuija Helander
1987: Tuija Helander-Kuusisto
1988: Laila Andersson
1989: Tuija Helander-Kuusisto
1990: Tuija Helander-Kuusisto
1991: Anna Suurnäkki
1992: Anna Suurnäkki
1993: Marjut Töyli
1994: Petra Stenman
1995: Petra Stenman
1996: Petra Stenman
1997: Petra Söderström
1998: Petra Söderström
1999: Annika Kumlin
2000: Anja Rantanen
2001: Ilona Ranta
2002: Milla Kelo
2003: Manuela Bosco
2004: Petra Söderström
2005: Ilona Ranta
2006: Ilona Ranta

High jump
1960: Riitta-Maija Soppi
1961: Leena Kaarna
1962: Leena Kaarna
1963: Leena Kaarna
1964: Leena Kaarna
1965: Gun Nordlund
1966: Gun Nordlund
1967: Ritva Bister
1968: Ritva Bister
1969: Ritva Bister
1970: Eila Kelo
1971: Gun Nordlund
1972: Pia Salonen
1973: Susanne Sundqvist
1974: Susanne Sundqvist
1975: Susanne Sundqvist
1976: Susanne Sundqvist
1977: Susanne Sundqvist
1978: Susanne Sundqvist
1979: Kaisa Alasaari
1980: Minna Vehmasto
1981: Minna Vehmasto
1982: Lena Teckenberg
1983: Minna Vehmasto
1984: Niina Ranta
1985: Niina Vihanto
1986: Minna Rantanen
1987: Ringa Ropo-Junnila
1988: Marita Pakarinen
1989: Sari Karjalainen
1990: Katja Kilpi
1991: Katja Kilpi
1992: Katja Kilpi
1993: Johanna Manninen
1994: Kaisa Lehtonen
1995: Kaisa Gustafsson
1996: Kaisa Gustafsson
1997: Kaisa Gustafsson
1998: Kaisa Gustafsson
1999: Marianne Mattas
2000: Hanna Grobler
2001: Hanna Grobler
2002: Hanna Grobler
2003: Hanna Grobler
2004: Alina Mattila
2005: Hanna Grobler
2006: Hanna Grobler

Pole vault
1994: Birgitta Ivanoff
1995: Teija Saari
1996: Tiina Vilenius
1997: Teija Saari
1998: Teija Saari
1999: Teija Saari
2000: Annu Mäkelä
2001: Teija Saari
2002: Teija Saari
2003: Hanna Palamaa
2004: Saara Laaksonen
2005: Aino-Maija Karvinen
2006: Minna Nikkanen

Long jump
1960: Brita Johansson
1961: Brita Johansson
1962: Maija Koivusaari
1963: Maija Koivusaari
1964: Maija Koivusaari
1965: Maija Koivusaari
1966: Sirpa Niiranen
1967: Maija Koivusaari
1968: Maija Koivusaari
1969: Pirkko Helenius
1970: Pirkko Helenius
1971: Hannele Harju
1972: Tuula Rautanen
1973: Tuula Rautanen
1974: Pirkko Helenius
1975: Tuula Rautanen
1976: Tuula Rautanen
1977: Pirkko Helenius
1978: Leena Pylkkänen
1979: Leena Pylkkänen
1980: Leena Pylkkänen
1981: Tarja Koskelo
1982: Anne Kyllönen
1983: Anne Kyllönen
1984: Anna-Maija Bryggare
1985: Ragne Backman
1986: Ringa Ropo-Junnila
1987: Ringa Ropo-Junnila
1988: Ringa Ropo-Junnila
1989: Ringa Ropo-Junnila
1990: Ringa Ropo-Junnila
1991: Ringa Ropo-Junnila
1992: Ringa Ropo-Junnila
1993: Nina Saarman
1994: Ringa Ropo-Junnila
1995: Heli Koivula Kruger
1996: Heli Koivula Kruger
1997: Johanna Halkoaho
1998: Heli Koivula Kruger
1999: Tiia Hautala
2000: Susanna Rajamäki
2001: Johanna Halkoaho
2002: Heli Koivula Kruger
2003: Johanna Halkoaho
2004: Heli Koivula Kruger
2005: Niina Saarman-Bartholdi
2006: Maija Kovalainen

Triple jump
1990: Ragne Kytölä
1991: Carina Kjellman
1992: Carina Kjellman
1993: Marika Salminen
1994: Marika Salminen
1995: Kaisa Gustafsson
1996: Heli Koivula Kruger
1997: Sari Kulmala
1998: Heli Koivula Kruger
1999: Natalia Kilpeläinen
2000: Heli Koivula Kruger
2001: Heli Koivula Kruger
2002: Heli Koivula Kruger
2003: Heli Koivula Kruger
2004: Heli Koivula Kruger
2005: Natalia Kilpeläinen
2006: Natalia Kilpeläinen

Shot put
1960: Inkeri Talvitie
1961: Inkeri Talvitie
1962: Inkeri Lehtonen
1963: Marjatta Mäkinen
1964: Marjatta Mäkinen
1965: Marjatta Mäkinen
1966: Marjatta Mäkinen
1967: Marjatta Kuuluvainen
1968: Marjatta Kuuluvainen
1969: Christine Huttunen
1970: Christine Barck
1971: Christine Barck
1972: Christine Barck
1973: Christine Barck
1974: Ritva Metso
1975: Ritva Metso
1976: Ritva Metso
1977: Ritva Metso
1978: Tuula Kivi
1979: Tuula Kivi
1980: Tuula Kivi
1981: Tuula Kivi
1982: Tuula Kivi
1983: Asta Ovaska
1984: Asta Ovaska
1985: Asta Ovaska
1986: Asta Ovaska
1987: Asta Ovaska
1988: Asta Ovaska
1989: Asta Ovaska
1990: Asta Ovaska
1991: Asta Ovaska
1992: Asta Ovaska
1993: Asta Ovaska
1994: Karoliina Lundahl
1995: Marika Tuliniemi
1996: Karoliina Lundahl
1997: Marika Tuliniemi
1998: Karoliina Lundahl
1999: Anna Rauhala
2000: Anna Rauhala
2001: Anna Rauhala
2002: Anna Rauhala
2003: Niina Kelo
2004: Niina Kelo
2005: Niina Kelo
2006: Suvi Helin

Discus throw
1960: Inkeri Talvitie
1961: Inkeri Talvitie
1962: Inkeri Lehtonen
1963: Marjatta Mäkinen
1964: Marjatta Mäkinen
1965: Marjatta Mäkinen
1966: Marjatta Mäkinen
1967: Marjatta Kuuluvainen
1968: Marjatta Kuuluvainen
1969: Marjatta Kuuluvainen
1970: Marjatta Kuuluvainen
1971: Marja-Leena Karttunen
1972: Christine Barck
1973: Christine Barck
1974: Ritva Metso
1975: Ritva Metso
1976: Sinikka Riihelä
1977: Sinikka Salminen
1978: Sinikka Salminen
1979: Sinikka Salminen
1980: Ulla Lundholm
1981: Ulla Lundholm
1982: Satu Sulkio
1983: Ulla Lundholm
1984: Ulla Lundholm
1985: Marja-Leena Larpi
1986: Anne Känsäkangas
1987: Anne Känsäkangas
1988: Anne Känsäkangas
1989: Merja Säntti
1990: Diana Back
1991: Kati Siltovuori
1992: Marja Aalto
1993: Kati Siltovuori
1994: Kirsi Lindfors
1995: Diana Back
1996: Tiina Kankaanpää
1997: Tiina Kankaanpää
1998: Tiina Kankaanpää
1999: Tiina Kankaanpää
2000: Tiina Kankaanpää
2001: Tiina Kankaanpää
2002: Tiina Kankaanpää
2003: Tiina Kankaanpää
2004: Anita Hietalahti
2005: Niina Kelo
2006: Anita Hietalahti

Hammer throw
1994: Anni Punttila
1995: Anni Punttila
1996: Mia Strömmer
1997: Sini Latvala
1998: Sini Latvala
1999: Mia Strömmer
2000: Mia Strömmer
2001: Mia Strömmer
2002: Sini Latvala
2003: Sini Latvala
2004: Sini Latvala
2005: Sini Latvala
2006: Sini Latvala

Javelin throw
1960: Sirpa Toivola
1961: Raija Talvensaari
1962: Sirpa Toivola
1963: Raija Talvensaari
1964: Kaisa Launela
1965: Raija Mustonen
1966: Raija Mustonen
1967: Raija Mustonen
1968: Kaisa Launela
1969: Arja Mustakallio
1970: Kirsti Launela
1971: Kirsti Launela
1972: Kirsti Launela
1973: Pirjo Kumpulainen
1974: Pirjo Kumpulainen
1975: Arja Mustakallio
1976: Arja Mustakallio
1977: Ritva Metso
1978: Sisko Kopiloff
1979: Helena Laine
1980: Tiina Lillak
1981: Tiina Lillak
1982: Tuula Laaksalo
1983: Tiina Lillak
1984: Tuula Laaksalo
1985: Tiina Lillak
1986: Tiina Lillak
1987: Tiina Lillak
1988: Tuula Laaksalo
1989: Päivi Alafrantti
1990: Tiina Lillak
1991: Heli Rantanen
1992: Heli Rantanen
1993: Päivi Alafrantti
1994: Mikaela Ingberg
1995: Heli Rantanen
1996: Heli Rantanen
1997: Heli Rantanen
1998: Heli Rantanen
1999: Mikaela Ingberg
2000: Mikaela Ingberg
2001: Paula Tarvainen
2002: Mikaela Ingberg
2003: Paula Tarvainen
2004: Mikaela Ingberg
2005: Mikaela Ingberg
2006: Paula Tarvainen

Pentathlon
1960: Tuovi Vahtera
1961: Seija Kuha
1962: Tuovi Vahtera
1963: Sirkka Norrlund
1964: Sirkka Norrlund
1965: Sirkka Norrlund
1966: Sirkka Norrlund
1967: Pirkko Heikkilä
1968: Pirkko Heikkilä
1969: Pirkko Helenius
1970: Pirkko Helenius
1971: Hannele Harju
1972: Riitta-Liisa Ketamo
1973: Eija Ristola
1974: Ritva Metso
1975: Ritva Metso
1976: Ritva Metso
1977: Ritva Metso
1978: Satu Jääskeläinen
1979: Anne Kyllönen
1980: Anne Kyllönen

Heptathlon
1981: Anne Kyllönen
1982: Anne Kyllönen
1983: Anne Kyllönen
1984: Mirja Järvenpää
1985: Ragne Backman
1986: Ragne Backman
1987: Satu Pauri
1988: Tina Rättyä
1989: Tina Rättyä
1990: Satu Pauri
1991: Tina Rättyä
1992: Helle Aro
1993: Helle Aro
1994: Tiia Hautala
1995: Tiia Hautala
1996: Tiia Hautala
1997: Tiia Hautala
1998: Piia Peltosaari
1999: Piia Peltosaari
2000: Susanna Rajamäki
2001: Annu Montell
2002: Tiia Hautala
2003: Tiia Hautala
2004: Tiia Hautala
2005: Sanna Saarman
2006: Sanna Saarman

5000 metres walk
1971: Pirkko Pollari
1972: Riitta Immonen
1973: Anne Fröberg
1974: Taina Havisto
1975: Anne Fröberg
1976: Sirkka Haataja
1977: Sirkka Haataja
1978: Sirkka Haataja
1979: Sirkka Haataja
1980: Sirkka Haataja
1981: Sirkka Haataja
1982: Sirkka Haataja
1983: Helena Åström
1984: Sirkka Oikarinen
1985: Sirkka Oikarinen
1986: Mirva Hämäläinen
1987: Sari Essayah
1988: Sari Essayah
1989: Sari Essayah
1990: Sari Essayah
1991: Sari Essayah
1992: Sari Essayah
1993: Sari Essayah
1994: Sari Essayah

10 kilometres walk
The championships were held on a track in 1985, 1987, 1988, 1990, 1996 and 2000.
1975: Anne Fröberg
1976: Not held
1977: Not held
1978: Not held
1979: Not held
1980: Not held
1981: Sirkka Haataja
1982: Sirkka Oikarinen
1983: Helena Åström
1984: Sirkka Oikarinen
1985: Sirkka Oikarinen
1986: Sirkka Oikarinen
1987: Mirva Hämäläinen
1988: Sari Essayah
1989: Sari Essayah
1990: Sari Essayah
1991: Sari Essayah
1992: Mira Saastamoinen
1993: Sari Essayah
1994: Sari Essayah
1995: Sari Essayah
1996: Sari Essayah
1997: Krista Ranta-Pere
1998: Outi Sillanpää
1999: Outi Sillanpää
2000: Tiina Muinonen
2001: Heidi Lindewall
2002: Outi Sillanpää
2003: Outi Sillanpää
2004: Outi Sillanpää
2005: Outi Sillanpää
2006: Marja Penttinen

20 kilometres walk
1995: Sari Essayah
1996: Sari Essayah
1997: Tarja Jaskari
1998: Tarja Jaskari
1999: Outi Sillanpää
2000: Outi Sillanpää
2001: Outi Sillanpää
2002: Outi Sillanpää
2003: Outi Sillanpää
2004: Outi Sillanpää
2005: Outi Sillanpää
2006: Marja Penttinen

Cross country
1960: Siiri Rantanen
1961: Eila Mikola
1962: Anna-Liisa Hälinen
1963: Eeva-Liisa Kalliolahti
1964: Eeva-Liisa Kalliolahti
1965: Eeva-Liisa Kalliolahti
1966: Eeva-Liisa Kalliolahti
1967: Eeva-Liisa Kalliolahti
1968: Pirjo Vihonen
1969: Inkeri Vaara
1970: Sirkka Ikäläinen
1971: Pirjo Vihonen
1972: Irja Pettinen
1973: Pirjo Vihonen
1974: Pirjo Vihonen
1975: Nina Holmén
1976: Sinikka Tyynelä
1977: Sinikka Tyynelä
1978: Elina Pulkkinen
1979: Irja Paukkonen
1980: Helena Heikkinen
1981: Irene Lusikka
1982: Helena Heikkinen
1983: Tuija Toivonen
1984: Tuija Toivonen
1985: Tuija Toivonen
1986: Päivi Tikkanen
1987: Tuija Toivonen
1988: Tuija Toivonen
1989: Tuija Toivonen
1990: Päivi Tikkanen
1991: Carita Sunell
1992: Carita Sunell
1993: Päivi Tikkanen
1994: Annemari Sandell-Hyvärinen
1995: Annemari Sandell-Hyvärinen
1996: Annemari Sandell-Hyvärinen
1997: Annemari Sandell-Hyvärinen
1998: Päivi Tikkanen
1999: Annemari Sandell-Hyvärinen
2000: Annemari Sandell-Hyvärinen
2001: Annemari Sandell-Hyvärinen
2002: Marjo Venäläinen
2003: Johanna Lehtinen
2004: Johanna Lehtinen
2005: Maija Oravamäki
2006: Annemari Sandell-Hyvärinen

References

Champions 1960–2006
Finnish Championships. GBR Athletics. Retrieved 2021-04-17.

Winners
 
Finnish Championships
Athletics